Hengam Rural District or Hangam Rural District may refer to:
 Hangam Rural District (Fars Province)
 Hengam Rural District (Hormozgan Province)